Mohammad Hossein Khodaparast (27 May 1938 – 26 March 2021) was an Iranian footballer. He competed in the men's tournament at the 1964 Summer Olympics.

References

External links

 

1938 births
2021 deaths
Iranian footballers
Iran international footballers
Olympic footballers of Iran
Footballers at the 1964 Summer Olympics
Sportspeople from Tabriz
Association football midfielders